Aata Pita is a Marathi film, released on 10 December 2010. The film has been produced by Twenty First Century Entertainment and directed by Uttung Shelar.  The film is inspired by Will Ferrell starrer Stranger than Fiction.

Cast 
Sanjay Narvekar as Nandkumar Deshmukh aka Nandu
Bharat Jadhav as Ashutosh Pawar aka Ashu
Satish Pulekar as Prof. V.V.Deshpande 
Ashwini & Others

Soundtrack
The music is directed and composed by Sanjeev Kohli.

Track listing

References

External links 
 Movie Review - movies.burrp.com

2010 films
2010s Marathi-language films